Cucumisin (euphorbain, solanain, hurain, tabernamontanain) is an enzyme. This enzyme catalyzes hydrolysis of a wide range of proteins. It has been identified as an allergen in humans.

This enzyme is isolated from the sarcocarp of the musk melon (Cucumis melo).

References

External links 
 

EC 3.4.21